The 2022 Nuneaton and Bedworth Borough Council election was held on 5 May 2022 to elect members of Nuneaton and Bedworth Borough Council. Seventeen seats of the thirty-four seats on the council were elected, as part of the wider 2022 local elections. 

The Conservative Party won twelve of the contested seats. As a result, they retained overall control of the council for the first time in the history of the borough. The Labour Party won four seats and the Green Party won one.

Background 

Nuneaton and Bedworth operates a divided election cycle. Each ward is represented by two councillors who each serve staggered four year terms. The result is that seventeen members of the borough council are elected every two years. 
The seats up for election in 2022 were last elected in 2018. In that election, the Conservatives won eleven seats while Labour won six. 

Labour had previously controlled the council for a thirty-five year period between 1973 and 2008. In 2008, the Conservative Party won control of the council before it reverted to no overall control in 2010. Labour regained control of the council for a six-year period between 2012 and 2018. Then it again returned to no overall control. At the 2021 Nuneaton and Bedworth Borough Council election, the Conservative Party gained ten seats, all from the Labour Party. As a result, the Conservatives gained control of the council for the first time since 2010.

Since the previous election in 2018, two councillors elected as Conservatives had resigned from the party to sit under the label "Nuneaton Community Independents". Neither of the councillors sought re-election in 2022. In October 2021, Patricia Elliott resigned as Labour councillor for the Barpool ward. The subsequent by-election was won by Conservative candidate Jamie Hartshorn.

The election count was conducted at the Nuneaton campus of North Warwickshire and South Leicestershire College.

Results 

Three seats changed hands in the election. Green candidate Michael Wright won the Weddington ward from the Conservatives. Meanwhile the Conservatives won two seats from Labour including the Barpool seat where they had won a by-election during the previous term. As a result, the Conservatives retained overall control of the coucil.

Council composition

Party reaction 

In  the wake of the results, the Conservative leader of the council Kris Wilson suggested that the Conservatives were 'building the foundations of a new blue base here in Nuneaton and Bedworth'. In reference to the party's improved performances in traditional Labour areas such as Camp Hill and Wem Brook, he said they were 'seats that Labour took for granted'.

Ward results 

Changes shown compared to the 2018 Nuneaton and Bedworth Borough Council election, when these seats were last contested. Swing figures are calculated between the winning candidate and the candidate in second place. Turnout figures include invalid ballots, therefore they may differ from total votes cast for all candidates.

Abbey

Arbury

Attleborough

Barpool

Bede

Bulkington

Camp Hill

Exhall

Galley Common

Heath

Kingswood

Poplar

Slough

St. Nicolas

Weddington

Wem Brook

Whitestone

Footnotes

References

Nuneaton and Bedworth
Nuneaton and Bedworth Borough Council elections